Hugh de Pierrepont (died 1229) was bishop of Liège from 1200 to 1229. He was French in origin, from the diocese of Laon; he was son of Hugues de Wasnad. He was supported after his election by Baldwin VI of Hainaut.  He married Clemence, daughter of Guitier, Count of Rethel.

He was a supporter of Emperor Frederick II.

He was victorious at the Battle of Steppes, 1213, leading an alliance against Henry I of Brabant.

Notes

1229 deaths
13th-century Roman Catholic bishops in the Holy Roman Empire
Prince-Bishops of Liège
Year of birth unknown
Place of birth missing